Danny Buday (born February 8, 1977) is filmmaker who wrote, directed, and produced the feature film Five Star Day, starring Cam Gigandet and Jena Malone. Five Star Day won the Jury Award for 'Best Feature' at the 2010 Stony Brook Film Festival and was honored as the Opening Night Gala Film at the 2010 Newport Beach Film Festival.

Career 

As an alumnus of the American Film Institute (AFI) masters directing program, Danny Buday wrote, directed, and composed the score for the AFI award-winning thesis film Dependency, which was recognized as an official selection of the Los Angeles International Short Film Festival, the Plus Camerimage International Film Festival, an official nominee of the A.S.C. Heritage Cinematography Award, and voted 'Best Student Film' of the Dallas Deep Ellum Film Festival. Danny also directed a second thesis film for AFI, a 1940s musical entitled The Name of the Game.

After graduating from AFI, Danny was hired to write the teen action/thriller Kennedy High for Barry Josephson’s company Josephson Entertainment (Enchanted, Bones) and wrote an early draft of the highly acclaimed adaptation ‘Veronika Decides To Die’ for author Paulo Coelho (The Alchemist) and producer Sriram Das. Danny was subsequently hired to write for producer Michael O’Hoven (Capote). Buday has an MFA in directing from the American Film Institute (AFI) and a bachelor's degree in Business Marketing from California State University at Long Beach.

Filmography 
Kennedy High  - Feature Film - Action/Thriller - Virtu* Entertainment - 2010/2011
[Also "Bad Cop" released 2010 -info unavailable]

Five Star Day  - Feature Film - Drama - Inferno Distribution - 2009/2010
 Starring Cam Gigandet and Jena Malone

The Name of the Game - AFI Thesis Film - 2006

Dependency  - AFI Thesis Film - 2005

Television 
A&E Biography  - Segment Producer - A&E Network - 6 episodes - Sean Penn, Mötley Crüe, New Kids on the Block,
Sean Cassidy, Amy Hecklering, James Foley (2005–2008)

[[The Beginning (2007 film)|The Making of...'The Beginning''']]  - Segment Producer/Camera  - Fuel TV/Birdhouse Skateboards - Sean White/Tony Hawk skateboard video (2007)

 Awards 
Jury Award 'Best Feature' -  Five Star Day - 2010 Stony Brook Film Festival

Best Student Film' - Dependency'' - 2005 Dallas Deep Ellum Film Festival

References 
Nigel M Smith (August 2, 2010) -  “Five Star Day” Tops Stony Brook Film Festival - IndieWire Magazine

Aileen Jacobson (July 16, 2010) -  33 Select Films Over 10 Days - New York Times

Pat Saperstein (March 31, 2010) - 'Five Star Day' to Open Beach Film Festival - Variety

Staff Report, AP (March 31, 2010) -  'Five Star Day' to Open Newport Beach Fest - Hollywood Reporter

Franck Tabouring (November 17, 2008) - Gigandet, Malone Gear Up for 'Five Star Day' - Internet Movie Database News (IMDb News)

Brian Brooks (April 1, 2010) - “Star" & “Juliet” Bookend 11th Newport Beach Fest - IndieWire Magazine

Elisabeth Rappe (November 17, 2008) - 'Twilight' Star Cam Gigandet Is Having A 'Five Star Day' - MTV Movie News

Darren Amner (August 22, 2009) - Five Star Filmmaking - Eye for Film Interview

External links 

 IndieWire News Article
 Official Danny Buday Website
Official Five Star Day Website starring Cam Gigandet and Jena Malone
Moving Pictures Magazine Article

Living people
American male screenwriters
American film producers
1977 births
Writers from Columbia, South Carolina
Film directors from South Carolina
Screenwriters from South Carolina